Nelson Boyd Chittum (born March 25, 1933 in Harrisonburg, Virginia) is an American former Major League Baseball pitcher for the St. Louis Cardinals and Boston Red Sox.

Career
Chittum attended Elizabethtown College, signed as an amateur free agent with the Cardinals in 1956, and won 23 games in his maiden season in professional baseball in the Class C California League. He made his major league debut with the team on August 1, 1958, versus the Los Angeles Dodgers, pitching three innings and surrendering eight hits.  Traded to the Red Sox the following season, he posted an 11–5 won-lost record in the Triple-A American Association before his recall to Boston. In 21 games played as a relief pitcher, he won all three of his decisions and posted a sparkling 1.19 earned run average in  innings pitched. However, in May , the Red Sox traded him to the Dodgers for veteran outfielder Rip Repulski, and Chittum returned to the Triple-A level for the remainder of his career.

After winning 106 minor league games, Chittum retired after the 1964 season.

External links

1933 births
Living people
Baseball players from Virginia
Boston Red Sox players
Fresno Cardinals players
Houston Buffaloes players
Major League Baseball pitchers
Minneapolis Millers (baseball) players
Montreal Royals players
Omaha Cardinals players
Omaha Dodgers players
People from Harrisonburg, Virginia
People from Lancaster County, Pennsylvania
Rochester Red Wings players
St. Louis Cardinals players
Spokane Indians players